North Reef may refer to:
North Reef, Solomon Islands
North Reef, Queensland
North Reef Light
North Reef, Paracel Islands
North Reef, Spratly Islands (in the North Danger Reef)

See also
in the Spratly Islands:
Gaven North Reef
Johnson North Reef aka Collins Reef
North Reef Island (India), one of the Andaman Islands